Thirunallur is a village in the Annavasalrevenue block of Pudukkottai district, Tamil Nadu, India.

Demographics 

 census, Thirunallur had a total population of 1969 with 972 males and 997 females. Out of the total population 1123    people were literate.

References

Villages in Pudukkottai district